Linguistic Intergroup Bias is a term coined by Anne Maass to describe a type of language bias which can perpetuate stereotypes. The model is based on the idea that people tend to use abstract language to describe actions which they believe to be stereotypical of a certain group, and concrete language to describe unusual or uncharacteristic behavior. Both relate to beliefs about the agent’s intrinsic nature or character. A positive action by someone you don't like, for instance, would tend to be described in concrete terms, because you regard it as uncharacteristic, while a negative action would be abstract, because you view it as typical. The reverse is true for people you do like. A positive action would be described in abstract terms because you would regard it as characteristic, and concrete if it is not. Using these different levels of linguistic abstraction serves to maintain a positive in-group bias and a negative out-group bias.

Definition
Coined by Anne Maass and her colleagues, linguistic intergroup bias is a model of stereotype maintenance (Whitley & Kite, 2010). This model states that positive ingroup descriptions and negative outgroup descriptions are abstract and vague, while negative ingroup descriptions and positive outgroup descriptions are specific and observable. Abstract statements are vague and harder to prove wrong, while, concrete statements are specific, and easy to brush off as exceptions to the rule, therefore keeping stereotypes intact (Whitley & Kite, 2010). Linguistic intergroup bias is more likely to occur when outgroup members are performing a group stereotype consistent action. This implies that the linguistic intergroup bias is a cognitive process that requires little motivation (Maass, et al. 1989).

Research
B. W. Gorham performed an experiment in which he presented an actual newscast to white individuals who took a pre-study survey about the amount of time they spent watching cable news TV, network news TV, regular television and news websites such as CNN.com. These subjects were then shown an actual news clip where a murder investigation is presented and the suspect had been described as either a black male or a white male.

There were significant differences in responses of participants who saw the white man portrayed as the suspect rather than the black man: Participants said the white suspect “probably hurt the victims”. However, when the black man was presented as the suspect, the participants said the suspect “is probably violent” (Gorham, 2006). Gorham found that participants were more likely to describe the (negative) incident with adjectives, the most abstract description, if the suspect was presented as black and therefore outgroup, while using more concrete terms to describe the white (ingroup) suspect.

Recent research has identified a related linguistic effect in which counterstereotypical individuals are liked significantly less than stereotypical individuals when they are described using behaviours but significantly more when they are described using traits. So, for example, people like “a man who is crying” less than “a woman who is crying” but they like “a sensitive man” more than “a sensitive woman”. In both cases, the man is counterstereotypical and the woman is stereotypical. However, in the former case the man and woman are described using a behaviour (“crying”) and in the latter case they are described using a trait (“sensitive”). suggest that this behaviour-trait effect is caused by differences in cognitive processing: Counterstereotypical individuals are evaluated relatively negatively when they are described using behaviours because this linguistic description promotes deeper and more systematic processing which highlights the individuals’ stereotype disconfirmation. In contrast, counterstereotypical individuals are evaluated relatively positively when they are described using traits because this linguistic description promotes heuristic processing which highlights the individuals’ uniqueness.

See also
 Bias
 In-group–out-group bias
 Prejudice
 Stereotypes
 Stereotype Maintenance
 Racism

References 
Notes

Sources
Gorham, B. W. (2006). News Media's Relationship With Stereotyping: The Linguistic Intergroup Bias in Response to Crime News.Journal of Communication, 56(2), 289–308.
Maass, A., Salvi, D., Acuri, L., & Semin, G. R. (1989). Language use in intergroup contexts: The linguistic intergroup bias. Journal of Personality and Social Psychology, 57, 981–993.
Whitley, B. E., & Kite, M. E. (2010). The psychology of prejudice and discrimination. Wadsworth, Cengage Learning.

Sociological theories